Wren is both an English surname and a gender neutral given name, both derived from the English name of the songbird.

It has recently increased in popularity as a name for girls and boys in the Anglosphere along with other names derived from the natural world. It has been ranked among the 1,000 most popular names for newborns in the United States since 2013 and among the top 500 names for girls in England and Wales since 2014.

Notable people with the name include:

Surname:
 Alan Wren (born 1964), English rock drummer 
 Bob Wren (born 1974), Canadian ice hockey player 
 Caroline Wren, political campaign worker
 Christopher Wren (1632–1723), English architect and scientist
 Daniel A. Wren (born ca. 1935) is an American business theorist
 Frank Wren (born 1958), American baseball executive  
 Harold G. Wren (1921–2016), American dean of three law schools
 Jackie Wren (1936–2020), Scottish footballer
 John Wren  (1871–1953), Australian businessman
 Kyle Wren (born 1991), American baseball player
 M. K. Wren (1938–2016), American author
 Margery Wren (1850–1930), English murder victim
 Matthew Wren (1585–1667), English clergyman and scholar
 P. C. Wren (1875–1941), British author 
 Renell Wren (born 1995), American football player
 Thomas Wren (1826–1904), American politician
Given name:
 Wren Blackberry, American teacher and author
 Wren Blair (1925–2013), former Canadian ice hockey coach

Fictional characters:
 Wren, a scientist from the movie Alien: Resurrection
 The Wren, an escape artist from the movie Cube
 Wren Elessedil, a character from the Heritage of Shannara series of fantasy novels 
 Wren (Sherwood Smith character), the orphanage-director-assigned name of the protagonist of a series of fantasy-fiction books by Sherwood Smith
  an android from the video game Phantasy Star III
  an android from the video game Phantasy Star IV
 Wren MacPherson, the third and youngest child of Darryl and Wanda McPherson in the comic strip Baby Blues
 Wren Natsworthy, daughter to Tom and Hester Natsworthy in the last installments of Philip Reeve's Mortal Engines Quartet
 Wren Douglas, a plus-sized model and author in Significant Others, the fifth book in Armistead Maupin's Tales of the City series
 Wren Kingston, a character from the TV Series Pretty Little Liars, played by Julian Morris
 Sabine Wren, a character from the TV Series Star Wars Rebels
 Christopher Wren, a character in the Agatha Christie play The Mousetrap

Notes

See also
 Wrenn

English-language unisex given names
English-language surnames
Given names derived from birds